Alexandra Robbins is a journalist, lecturer, and author. Her books focus on young adults, education, and modern college life. Five of her books have been New York Times Bestsellers.

Biography
She graduated from Walt Whitman High School in Bethesda, Maryland in 1994, and summa cum laude from Yale University in 1998.  She was editor-in-chief of her high school newspaper, the Black & White.

She has also written for a variety of publications, including Vanity Fair, The New Yorker, Los Angeles Times, The Atlantic Monthly, The Washington Post, USA Today, Cosmopolitan, and Salon.com. Robbins has appeared in the media, such as 60 Minutes, The Oprah Winfrey Show, Coast To Coast AM, The Today Show, Paula Zahn Now, The View, The Colbert Report, CBS Early Show, The Smart Woman Survival Guide, The O'Reilly Factor, and Anderson Cooper 360°, and networks including CNN, NPR, the BBC, MSNBC, CNBC, C-SPAN, and the History Channel.

Writings
Robbins has won several awards for her writing. Her book The Geeks Shall Inherit The Earth won the Best Nonfiction Book of the Year Award in the 2011 Goodreads Choice Awards. Robbins also received a Books for a Better Life Award in 2012.

In 2014, Robbins was the winner of the John Bartlow Martin Award for Public Interest Magazine Journalism. Her article, "Children Are Dying," investigated a shortage of critical nutrients that premature babies and other patients need to survive. One week after Washingtonian Magazine published Robbins’ article, the FDA agreed to import the nutrients from other countries.

On May 28, 2015, Robbins wrote a New York Times op-ed about inadequate nurse staffing at hospitals in the United States.

Bush educational record
Along with author Jane Mayer, she broke the story about President Bush's unimpressive college grades and SATs in The New Yorker. The article got such media attention that reporters called to interview her and asked what her SAT scores were. She has not made her scores known publicly.
Robbins was a member of Scroll and Key, one of Yale's secret societies, and has written a book, "Secrets of the Tomb", a social history of societies at Yale, featuring Skull and Bones. The book's 2002 release was timely given the membership of George W. Bush and George H. W. Bush in Bones, and then more so when John Kerry, another member, was the Democratic Party's 2004 presidential nominee.

Robbins was a guest on the satirical program The Colbert Report on August 9 of 2006, during which Colbert challenged claims Robbins makes in The Overachievers, citing some observations of  Robbins' own experience, while she countered with observations about systemic problems resulting from a highly competitive system, the cheating that is endemic to competition and problems with standardized testing, arguing that the aforementioned conditions teach misplaced values. A video of this interview is available from Comedy Central.

Books
Robbins, Alexandra (2023) The Teachers: A Year Inside America’s Most Vulnerable, Important Profession, Dutton

References

External links

Home Page

Yale University alumni
American women journalists
Living people
Writers from Maryland
American women writers
Year of birth missing (living people)
People from Bethesda, Maryland
21st-century American women
Walt Whitman High School (Maryland) alumni